"Million Dollar View" is a song recorded by American country music artist Trace Adkins.  It was released in November 2011 as the second and final single from the album Proud to Be Here.  The song reached #38 on the Billboard Hot Country Songs chart.  The song was written by David Lee Murphy and George Teren.

Chart performance

References

2011 singles
2011 songs
Trace Adkins songs
Songs written by David Lee Murphy
Songs written by George Teren
Song recordings produced by Michael Knox (record producer)
Song recordings produced by Mark Wright (record producer)
Show Dog-Universal Music singles